Cornell Big Red ice hockey may refer to either of the ice hockey teams that represent Cornell University:
Cornell Big Red men's ice hockey
Cornell Big Red women's ice hockey